Elliot Minchella (born 28 January 1996) is an English professional rugby league footballer who plays as a  or  for Hull Kingston Rovers in the Betfred Super League.

He previously played for the Leeds Rhinos in the Super League, and on loan from Leeds at the London Broncos in the Championship. Minchella has also played for the Sheffield Eagles in the second tier, and the Bradford Bulls in League 1 and the Betfred Championship.

Background
Minchella was born in Bradford, West Yorkshire, England.

Playing career
Minchella made his Super League début for Leeds Rhinos in 2013, scoring a try in a victory over Salford in his only appearance on the year. He made a further five appearances in 2014 before an off-field incident involving him and club mate Zak Hardaker being involved in an assault put him out of favour at Leeds.

In 2015 Minchella was  loaned to Championship club London Broncos for of the season, in 18 games he scored four tries and kicked a drop goal.

He then signed for the Sheffield Eagles and in two seasons played 56 times and scored 21 tries for the club.

Minchella signed for home town side the Bradford Bulls on a 2-year deal on 21 September 2017. At the end of the 2018 season, Minchella signed a 3 year full time deal with Bradford but in 2019 he was one of five players Bradford sold to Hull Kingston Rovers. In his two seasons at Bradford he made 59 appearances scoring 45 tries and becoming a regular goalkicker scoring 37 goals.

The curtailed 2020 season saw him limited to just 16 appearances for Hull KR and in the second game of the 2021 season he suffered an anterior cruciate ligament injury which ruled him out for the rest of the season.

References

External links
Hull Kingston Rovers profile

1996 births
Living people
Bradford Bulls players
Dewsbury Rams players
English people of Italian descent
English rugby league players
Hull Kingston Rovers players
Leeds Rhinos players
London Broncos players
Rugby league locks
Rugby league players from Bradford
Sheffield Eagles players